Tamar Katz (born September 26, 1989 ) is an Israeli-American former competitive figure skater. She is the 2005, 2007, and 2008 Israeli national champion.

Personal life
Tamar Katz was born September 26, 1989 in Dallas, Texas. The daughter of Leora and Yirmi Katz, she was raised with two brothers, Eyal and Ronen. Due to her father's work as a diplomat at the Israeli Embassy in Washington, D.C., she resided in Maryland from the age of seven, before settling in Metula, Israel when she was 13. At age 15, she returned to the United States for training opportunities. She began college studies at the University of Pennsylvania in 2010.

In September 2010, her brother, Ronen, was killed in a hit and run accident in New York City.

Career 
Katz began skating as an extracurricular activity at the age of 9 and became more serious about skating a year later. She trained in Rockville, Maryland until she was 13, followed by Metula, Israel until age 15, and then in the United States again.

Katz's best season was 2006–07. She won a silver medal at the 2006 Golden Spin of Zagreb, finished a career-best 13th at the 2007 European Championships, and qualified for the free skate at the 2007 World Championships.

In 2008, Katz was 16th at the Europeans and 22nd at Worlds. She sustained a stress fracture to her right foot and a broken hand in December 2008 and missed the 2009 European Championships. She finished 25th at the 2009 World Championships. She was coached by Peter Burrows in Monsey, New York.

Katz qualified a spot for Israel in ladies' figure skating at the 2010 Olympics with her 12th-place finish at the 2009 Nebelhorn Trophy; she was the first Israeli ladies' single skater to qualify for an Olympics. However, suffering from a virus, she had a poor showing at the 2010 European Championships, failing to meet the Israeli Olympic committee's criterion of finishing in the top 14 at the event. Katz appealed this decision with the support of the Israeli Ice Skating Federation, but was unsuccessful. The Israeli Olympic Committee ceded the Olympic spot to the alternate, Australian skater Cheltzie Lee. Katz stated that "The Israeli Olympic Committee said that they want medals and that I can compete in 2014. What they don't understand is that if they want me to medal at 2014, the crucial exposure and experience that this Olympics would have given me has been taken away." She competed at the 2010 World Championships, but did not qualify for the free skate. During the 2009–10 season, she was coached by Burrows, Mary-Lynn Gelderman, and Galit Chait  at Sport-o-Rama in Monsey, New York and then by Mark Mitchell and Peter Johansson in Boston, Massachusetts.

Programs

Competitive highlights 
JGP: Junior Grand Prix

See also
List of select Jewish figure skaters

References

External links 
 
 

1989 births
People from Dallas
American emigrants to Israel
20th-century American Jews
Israeli female single skaters
Israeli Jews
Living people
21st-century American Jews